Positive I.D. is a 1987 American crime film written and directed by Andy Anderson. The film stars Stephanie Rascoe Myers, John S. Davies, Steven Fromholz, Lauren Lane, Gail Cronauer and Matthew Sacks. The film was released on October 27, 1987, by Universal Pictures.

Plot
Julie Kenner had been raped a year ago and is still psychologically suffering. She repels her husband Don, takes a lot of tranquilizers and is regularly seeing a psychiatrist. When Dana, a charming neighbor, suggests rape was "every woman's fantasy" and there must have been some point at which she enjoyed it, Julie physically lashes out at her, further alienating her from her husband and friends.

Her situation is worsened by her learning that her rapist Vinnie DeStephano has cut a deal to be released from prison. She accidentally learns that it's technically possible to assume the identity of a dead person and finds in this idea a way to recover. While she continues to spend most of her time as a recovering Julie in front of her husband, she creates the identity of Bobbie King, a vivacious red-haired woman from Florida, using a dead child's birth certificate and getting herself arrested and released on a bad-check charge to create a criminal record (and paper trail) for her alter ego. As Bobbie, she hangs out at Vinnie's uncle's bar downtown, where Roy Mercer works and befriends her. One night, they have rough sex in a hotel, suggesting that Mercer may have a deeper knowledge about her than he's letting on. Meanwhile, as Julie spends more time away from home as Bobbie, Dana fills the void in taking care of her two little girls (and her husband).

The day Vinnie is released from prison, she walks into the bar as Bobbie. As the owner tries to introduce them and Vinnie says "Don't I know you from somewhere?" she shoots Vinnie dead and walks away and drives home. The next morning, news coverage states that a "positive I.D." has been made of Vinnie's killer as Bobbie King, the wanted check-kiter from Florida. In a TV interview, Mercer is revealed to be an undercover detective, and tells the press Bobbie is a professional assassin who will never get caught. Reporters track Julie down in front of her house to ask if she feels vindicated by Vinnie's death, she says no and flees inside. When she kisses her children awake, they initially call out "Aunt Dana" instead.
 
The final scene is her dressed as Bobbie, stepping into a phone booth at a truck stop. A semi truck pulls up, leaves, and the phone booth is empty.

Cast 
Stephanie Rascoe Myers as Julie Kenner / Bobbie King
John S. Davies as Don Kenner
Steven Fromholz as Roy Mercer
Lauren Lane as Dana 
Gail Cronauer as Melissa
Matthew Sacks as Mr. Tony
Audeen Casey as Dr. Sterling
Steven Jay Hoey as Johnny
Erin White as Katie Kenner
Terry Leeser as Vinnie DeStephano
Steve Garrett as Clerk at Vital Statistics
Dottie Mandel as Woman at Maildrop
James Buchanan as Pawnbroker
William Spurlock as Mr. Bernard
Tim Hatcher as Bill Duncan
Raul Flores as Gino

References

External links 
 

1987 films
American crime films
1980s crime films
Universal Pictures films
1980s English-language films
1980s American films